A double exponential function is a constant raised to the power of an exponential function. For example, if a = b = 10:
f(x) = 1010x
f(0) = 10
f(1) = 1010
f(2) = 10100 = googol
f(3) = 101000
f(100) = 1010100 = googolplex.

Factorials grow faster than exponential functions, but much more slowly than doubly exponential functions. However, tetration and the Ackermann function grow faster. See Big O notation for a comparison of the rate of growth of various functions.

The inverse of the double exponential function is the double logarithm log(log(x)).

Doubly exponential sequences

Examples include
 The Fermat numbers 
 The harmonic primes: The primes p, in which the sequence  exceeds 0, 1, 2, 3, …The first few numbers, starting with 0, are 2, 5, 277, 5195977, ... 
 The Double Mersenne numbers 
 The elements of Sylvester's sequence   where E ≈ 1.264084735305302 is Vardi's constant .
 The number of k-ary Boolean functions: 
 The prime numbers 2, 11, 1361, ...   where A ≈ 1.306377883863 is Mills' constant.

Aho and Sloane observed that in several important integer sequences, each term is a constant plus the square of the previous term. They show that such sequences can be formed by rounding to the nearest integer the values of a doubly exponential function with middle exponent 2.
Ionaşcu and Stănică describe some more general sufficient conditions for a sequence to be the floor of a doubly exponential sequence plus a constant.

Applications

Algorithmic complexity
In computational complexity theory, 2-EXPTIME is the class of decision problems solvable in doubly exponential time. It is equivalent to AEXPSPACE, the set of decision problems solvable by an alternating Turing machine in exponential space, and is a superset of EXPSPACE. An example of a problem in 2-EXPTIME that is not in EXPTIME is the problem of proving or disproving statements in Presburger arithmetic.

In some other problems in the design and analysis of algorithms, doubly exponential sequences are used within the design of an algorithm rather than in its analysis. An example is Chan's algorithm for computing convex hulls, which performs a sequence of computations using test values hi = 22i (estimates for the eventual output size), taking time O(n log hi) for each test value in the sequence. Because of the double exponential growth of these test values, the time for each computation in the sequence grows singly exponentially as a function of i, and the total time is dominated by the time for the final step of the sequence. Thus, the overall time for the algorithm is O(n log h) where h is the actual output size.

Number theory
Some number theoretical bounds are double exponential. Odd perfect numbers with n distinct prime factors are known to be at most , a result of Nielsen (2003).

The maximal volume of a polytope in a d-dimensional integer lattice with k ≥ 1 interior lattice points is at most

a result of Pikhurko (2001).

The largest known prime number in the electronic era has grown roughly as a double exponential function of the year since Miller and Wheeler found a 79-digit prime on EDSAC1 in 1951.

Theoretical biology

In population dynamics the growth of human population is sometimes supposed to be double exponential. Varfolomeyev and Gurevich experimentally fit

where N(y) is the population in millions in year y.

Physics
In the Toda oscillator model of self-pulsation, the logarithm of amplitude varies exponentially with time (for large amplitudes), thus the amplitude varies as doubly exponential function of time.

Dendritic macromolecules have been observed to grow in a doubly-exponential fashion.

References

Elementary special functions
Exponentials